The Kawasaki Ninja ZX-9R is a motorcycle in the Ninja sport bike series from Japanese manufacturer Kawasaki, produced from 1994 until 2003. There were five model incarnations across two basic designs.

In Kawasaki's chronology the 9Rs connect to the ZX900 (Ninja, which in many markets was sold as GPZ900R) as the type number corresponding to frame numbers was ZX900A, ZX900B and ZX900C. This definition is practical to note as the last version of the B-model is disguised as a C-model (caused by a change in outer design which the oncoming C-model inherited).

Introduction 
Kawasaki developed the model in response to Honda's introduction of the CBR900RR Fireblade for the 1992 model year, ten years after the first 900cc Ninja. By 1992 there were no bikes in the 900cc class until Honda introduced the Fireblade, and following Honda, Kawasaki introduced the ZX-9R at the Paris Motor Show in September of 1992. Though based on the ZX-7, when development of the ZX-9R was done, only the swing arm of the original was left. The engine also was developed from that of the ZX-7, but the two engines shared only a few parts.

The Fireblade packaged a 900 cc engine into a 750 cc sport bike chassis. It combined big-bore power with sport bike handling, but, crucially, it also pioneered meticulous attention to weight-saving design. The Fireblade not only outpowered the 750's, it was also significantly lighter. This was the detail overlooked or underappreciated by Kawasaki when they set out to build their Fireblade-beater. In building the first ZX-9R, Kawasaki combined their class-leading big-bore, the ZZR1100, with their class-leading 750, the ZXR750, rather than commit to an entirely new design.

Rather than be a direct competitor, the ZX-9R was retained as a more stable and more comfortable alternative to the Honda, with more straight-line speed.

Model history

ZX900B (1994) and ZX900B2 (1995) 

The first ZX-9R could be seen as a ZXR750 incorporating a number of ZZ-R1100 design features. The wheels - three-spoke cast aluminium alloy 3.5-inch x 17-inch front and 5.5-inch x 17-inch rear -, the front forks - fully adjustable 43 mm upside-down KYB - and unbraced fabricated aluminium box-section swingarm with fully adjustable remote-reservoir KYB monoshock were direct carry-overs from the ZXR. The twin-piston rear Tokico caliper no longer mounted via a torque arm, and the clip-on handlebars mounted above the top triple clamp, not below. The four-piston Tokico front calipers and 320 mm front discs were common to the ZZ-R and the ZXR.

The frame was a welded aluminium-alloy dual-beam with cast steering head and swingarm endplates, but with steel-tube engine cradles and swingarm-mount endplates extending back to support the rider's seat and attach the bolt-on subframe, like the ZZ-R1100.

The engine displacement was 899 cc. The crankcases, clutch and gearbox were carried over from the ZXR750, with a longer-throw crank and a bigger-bore, taller cylinder block for the larger capacity. The cylinder head was externally highly similar to the ZXR, as well, but incorporated rocker valve actuation like the ZZ-R1100 instead of the ZXR's direct actuation. Redline was 12,000 rpm against the Fireblades 10,500 rpm. Induction was by 40 mm Keihin CVKD carburettors, and the engine breathed through a 10-litre airbox fed by dual ram-air intakes on the nose of the bike, under the single headlight, via ducts passing back and over the frame beams near the steering head, like on the ZZ-R.

ZX900B3 (1996) and ZX900B4 (1997) 
The rear suspension linkage and rear spring rate were replaced, improving handling. Pillion grab rails were added, the gearboxes were made stronger, and new six-piston Tokico front calipers replaced the previous model's four-piston units.

ZX900C1 (1998) and ZX900C2 (1999) 
Engine bore, stroke and redline remained unchanged; everything else was completely new. The clutch was changed from hydraulic to cable-operated. The generator was moved from behind the cylinder to the more conventional location at the left end of the crank. There was now no balance shaft. The valvetrain switched to direct valve actuation, and the cylinder head was plumbed for then-new plug-top ignition coils, replacing more conventional remote coils and high-tension leads. Notably, the new engine also featured a Hall-type cam position sensor on the exhaust camshaft. Cam position sensors are typically used in conjunction with electronic fuel injection. As the ZX900C featured induction by Keihin 40 mm CVKD carburettors, a cam position sensor wasn't necessary. Its inclusion could indicate that Kawasaki had designs to include fuel injection on the engine in the future. This first happened on the 2000 ZX-12R Kawasaki's first fuel-injected sport bike since the 1981–1985 GPZ1100. But this did not happen on this engine until the 2003 introduction of the Z1000, which uses a bored-out ex-ZX-9R engine.

The frame lost the steel engine cradles, but also its bolt-on subframe and the rear ride height adjuster. The swingarm was a new unbraced, rectangular-section extruded design. The wheel sizes were the same, but the wheels were a new, lighter design. The brake calipers carried over, but the discs were smaller and lighter without stopping power being affected. The rear shock absorber changed from a remote-reservoir to a lighter, more compact piggyback design.

New 46 mm right-way-up KYB forks replaced the heavier, though stiffer 43 mm upside down forks on the B model. The front forks were criticised by some european testers for fluttering during hard driving, a phenomenon that was only solved with the 2002 model.

Visually, the new bike retained the rounded look of its predecessor, but became sleeker, with a slimmer tail unit and a smaller fairing. As a consequence of the smaller engine and shorter wheelbase, though, the fuel tank became wider and intruded more on the riding position than before.

ZX900E1 (2000) and ZX900E2 (2001) 

A new look was introduced for the 2000 model, with distinctive twin headlights and a separate ram-air intake replacing the single headlight and integrated intake of the C-model. The engine gained a few horsepower from slightly shorter length CVRD 40 mm carburettors, a compression ratio increase to 12:2:1 from 11.5:1, and larger diameter (35mm vs. 31.8mm) header pipes. A lower duration intake cam increased cranking compression. Further improvements were aimed primarily at handling.

The frame was made stiffer through the enlarging of the front engine mounting bolts, though this still left the ZX-9R with just a single front engine mount on either side of the frame. Further, the rubber bushings in the top rear engine mount were changed to alloy. This combined to make the engine's contribution to the stiffness of the frame/engine unit greater.

The swingarm pivot and wheel spindles were made larger in diameter, again for more stiffness. Increased offset on the triple clamps reduced the trail on the front wheel to make the steering more agile. The forks were shortened to save weight, and the rear shock top mount was redesigned to incorporate a ride-height adjuster.

ZX900F1 (2002) and ZX900F2 (2003) 
Changes to the 2002–2003 ZX-9R included a new tail fairing, a single piece front mudguard, the loss of the passenger grab handles and the B/C/E model H-bar mirror bracket. Mechanical additions included a top braced swingarm (claimed 20% stronger) and rear shock with a side facing fluid reservoir, stiffened frame with relocated solid engine mounts, increased trail and reduced fork offset, and new Nissin four-piston caliper brakes and 320 mm discs at the front wheel. Slight engine modifications included a return to the B/C model style Keihin CVKD carburettor and a 10% heavier crankshaft offset by a reduced diameter flywheel reported to help the engine spin up quicker, boosting low and mid-range torque.

In 2004 the ZX-9R was replaced with the ZX-10R.

Performance
The 1998 ZX9r C1 was the first stock production motorcycle to run a quarter mile in under 10 seconds with a 9.99 @ 136.8 mph time. The 1999 C2 ran 10.06 @ 138.96 mph. A California-only 1998 ZX9r C1, with "1 HP less power", ran a tested 10.28 @ 135.32 mph quarter mile time. Motor Cycle News got a tested 1/4-mile time of 10.6 secs. Cycle World recorded a 10.19 @ 137.90 mph from a 2002 ZX-9R F1. California-specific evaporative emissions control (EVAP) models included two-stage exhaust catalytic converters, two additional fuel tank fuel vapor recovery plumbing tubes fed to an under tank charcoal canister, an evaporative emission purge control valve incorporated into the Y-snorkel RAM air system float bowl equalization plumbing, and carburetors with electronic fuel cut off solenoids. The California EVAP model ZX-9Rs were also sold selectively throughout the U.S., including Illinois, Florida, and New York. They vented less pollution into the atmosphere, thus using what would otherwise be evaporating fuel into better fuel economy.

U.K. models, which were similar to 49-state U.S. models, in that they were not fitted with California EVAP emissions plumbing valves and equipment, included the P sub-variant of ZX-9R and didn’t carry the consequential model year labeling.  For instance, a 2003 U.S. model ZX-9R F2, the last ZX-9R produced by Kawasaki, could be labeled by an owner in the U.K. as a 2004, 2005, 2006, etc, etc, etc,... ZX-9R F2P depending on what year it was registered.  Many U.K. destined ZX-9Rs were also outfitted with carburetor heater plumbing, as part of the engine’s cooling system.  The purpose was reported to prevent carburetor icing, a symptom that has not been reported by ZX-9R owners anywhere outside the U.K.

See also 
Kawasaki Ninja series

References 

|

External links 
Smart Money Tips: Buying a Used 1998–2003 Kawasaki ZX-9R Video Review (Men and Motors) Kawasaki ZX9R vs Honda Fireblade Comparison (1998)
Top 10 sports bikes from the '90s
2000 E1 ZX-9R Review 
First Ride: Year 2000 Kawasaki ZX-9R Video Review (Men and Motors) ZX-9R v. ZX-9R
Kawasaki ZX-9R E1/E2 (2000 - 2001) review
Road Test: ZX-9R vs. VFR vs. 955i
Background Story: The infamous (2000 ZX-9R E1) Kawasaki launch
2001 E2 TotalMotorcycle online review Video Review (Men and Motors)
2002 F1 Motorcycle Daily Online Review
2002 Kawasaki ZX-9R Motorcycle Test Video Review (Men and Motors) Kawasaki ZX-9R - Road Test & Review
2003 F2 Motorcyclist Online Review
L/100km 2000 ZX-9R E1: 49 state 6.8, 4.9; CA EVAP 4.4, 4.5
Kawasaki Vehicle information

Ninja ZX-9R
Sport bikes
Motorcycles introduced in 1994